Greatest Hits, Volume II is the second greatest hits album by the American rock band Chicago, and its fifteenth album overall, released in 1981.

Background
Following the poor reception of 1980's Chicago XIV, Columbia Records dropped Chicago from its roster and cancelled a lucrative contract that had recently been signed.  While the band had begun its association with David Foster and was in the process of building a new identity, Columbia had contractual obligations for a new release.  Therefore, the label wanted a sequel to the band's first, and highly successful, hits package which had been 1975's Chicago IX: Chicago's Greatest Hits.  This sequel, Volume II, featured bare-bones album artwork consisting of a collage of photos from around the city of Chicago.  The album lacked liner notes, and it was the only album to lack the band's distinctive logo, aside from a small picture of it from its second album, which appears in the center of the collage.

Released in November 1981, Greatest Hits, Volume II primarily sampled material from Chicago VIII through 1978's Hot Streets, after which the hits stopped coming, though it also stretches back to pick up overlooked hits from the era first covered by the original compilation album.  Appearing just before Chicago's unexpected career revival with Chicago 16, reached #171 in the US.  Curiously, though "Dialogue Part I & II" is part of the track listing, Part I of the song is left off, leaving only the Part II outro.

Like its predecessor, Greatest Hits, Volume II has since been superseded by 2002's The Very Best of Chicago: Only the Beginning. Unlike the first volume, it is out of print.

Track listing

Side one
"Baby, What a Big Surprise" (Peter Cetera) – 3:03
"Dialogue (Part II)" (Robert Lamm) – 4:10 – incorrectly listed as "Parts I & II"
"No Tell Lover" (Cetera/Lee Loughnane/Danny Seraphine) – 3:47 – single edit
"Alive Again" (James Pankow) – 3:32 – single edit
"Old Days" (Pankow) – 3:29

Side two
"If You Leave Me Now" (Cetera) – 3:55
"Questions 67 and 68" (Lamm) – 3:26 – single edit
"Happy Man" (Cetera) – 3:15 – exclusive mix which edits out the false start featured on Chicago VII
"Gone Long Gone" (Cetera) – 3:57
"Take Me Back to Chicago" (Danny Seraphine/David Wolinski) – 3:00 – single edit

Greatest Hits, Volume II (Columbia 37682) reached #171 in the US during a chart stay of 5 weeks.  It did not chart in the UK.

Personnel 
 Peter Cetera – electric bass, acoustic guitar, lead and backing vocals
 Terry Kath – acoustic guitar, electric guitar, lead and backing vocals
 Robert Lamm – acoustic piano, keyboards, percussion, lead and backing vocals
 Lee Loughnane – trumpet, flugelhorn, cornet, guitar, percussion, backing vocals
 James Pankow – trombone, percussion, backing vocals
 Walter Parazaider – saxophones, flute, clarinet
 Danny Seraphine – drums, percussion
 Laudir de Oliveira – congas, bongos, Latin percussion
 Donnie Dacus – acoustic guitar, electric guitar, backing vocals

Charts

References

1981 greatest hits albums
Albums produced by James William Guercio
Albums produced by Phil Ramone
Chicago (band) compilation albums
Columbia Records compilation albums